A lawsuit is a legal case.

Lawsuit may also refer to:

 The Lawsuit (opera), a 2009 comic opera by Svetlana Nesterova, based Nikolai Gogol's work
 The Lawsuit, a fragmentary scene by Nicolai Gogol from the unfinished play The Order of Vladimir, Third Class
 "Lawsuit" (Space Ghost Coast to Coast), a television episode